The 2007 American National Rugby League season was the tenth annual American National Rugby League season of semi-professional rugby league football in North America. The season began on June 2, 2007 with a match between the Northern Raiders and the New York Knights, played at  Pier 40 Stadium located on the Hudson River.

The 2007 competition sees ten teams participating throughout nine round of the regular season, followed by the top six teams qualifying for the AMNRL playoff series.

The championship was won by the Connecticut Wildcats, who defeated the Aston DSC Bulls 20-18 at Hodges Stadium in Jacksonville, North Florida.

Pre Season
A new team has been allowed to join the American National Rugby League for the 2007 season the Fairfax Eagles while one team was not granted re-admittance following on from the 2006 season being the Boston Braves.
The Delaware Valley Mantarays club decided to merge with the Philadelphia Fight in order to form a stronger club and franchise.
The Glen Mills Bulls club relocated to Delaware County, Pennsylvania and changed the club name to the Aston Delco Sports Club Bulls or Aston DSC Bulls, however the club staff, management and playing roster will remain the same.
The AMNRL decided to change its format from a two conference pool system to a singular league format.

Regular Season Results

Ladder

Championship Match
The 2007 Championship Grand Final match was played for the first time at a set location, being Hodges Stadium located in Jacksonville, Florida.

See also
 American National Rugby League
 Rugby league in 2007

Footnotes

External links
Official websites
 American National Rugby League Online
 2007 AMNRL Schedule
 Club profiles at Amnrl.com

News sites
 AMNRL News
 AMNRL rugby league review World news 
 AMNRL League Unlimited

AMNRL
AMNRL
American National Rugby League seasons